Hildebrando Castro Pozo (1890–1945) was a Peruvian sociologist and politician.

Peruvian sociologists
1890 births
1945 deaths